The 2011–12 Cuban National Series was the 51st edition of the tournament. Due to the division of Habana Province there were 17 teams participating. The tournament began on Sunday, November 27 with a game between Ciego de Avila and Pinar del Río. The regular season finished on April 22; the final game of the playoffs was played on May 28 with Ciego de Avila beating Industriales.

Regular season standings

West

East

Playoffs

League leaders

References 

Cuban National Series seasons
Cuban National Series
Cuban National Series
2011 in Cuban sport